Anne "Ninon" de l'Enclos, also spelled Ninon de Lenclos and Ninon de Lanclos (10 November 1620 – 17 October 1705), was a French author, courtesan and patron of the arts.

Early life
Born Anne de l'Enclos in Paris on 10 November 1620, she was nicknamed "Ninon" at an early age by her father, Henri de l'Enclos, a lutenist and published composer, who taught her to sing and play the lute. In 1632, he was exiled from France after a duel. When Ninon's mother, Marie Barbe de la Marche, died ten years later, the unmarried Ninon entered a convent, only to leave the next year. For the remainder of her life she was determined to remain unmarried and independent.

Life as a courtesan and author
Returning to Paris, she became a popular figure in the salons, and her own drawing room became a centre for the discussion and consumption of the literary arts. In her early thirties she was responsible for encouraging the young Molière, and when she died she left money for the son of her notary, a nine-year-old named François-Marie Arouet, later to become known as Voltaire, so he could buy books.

It was during this period that her life as a courtesan began. Ninon took a succession of notable and wealthy lovers, including the king's cousin the Great Condé, Gaston de Coligny, and François, duc de La Rochefoucauld. These men did not support her, however; she prided herself on her independent income. "Ninon always had crowds of adorers but never more than one lover at a time, and when she tired of the present occupier, she said so frankly and took another. Yet such was the authority of this wanton, that no man dared fall out with his successful rival; he was only too happy to be allowed to visit as a familiar friend," Saint-Simon wrote. In 1652, Ninon took up with Louis de Mornay, the marquis de Villarceaux, by whom she had a son, also named Louis. She lived with the marquis until 1655, when she returned to Paris. When she would not return to him, the marquis fell into a fever; to console him, Ninon cut her hair and sent the shorn locks to him, starting a vogue for bobbed hair à la Ninon.

This life (less acceptable in her time than it would become in later years) and her opinions on organised religion caused her some trouble, and she was imprisoned in the Madelonnettes Convent in 1656 at the behest of Anne of Austria, Queen of France and regent for her son Louis XIV. Not long after, however, she was visited by Christina, former queen of Sweden. Impressed, Christina wrote to Cardinal Mazarin on Ninon's behalf and arranged for her release.

In response, as an author she defended the possibility of living a good life in the absence of religion, notably in 1659's La coquette vengée (The Flirt Avenged). She was also noted for her wit; among her numerous sayings and quips are "Much more genius is needed to make love than to command armies" and "We should take care to lay in a stock of provisions, but not of pleasures: these should be gathered day by day." A picture of Ninon, under the name of Damo, was sketched in Mlle. de Scudéry's Clélie (1654–1661).

Starting in the late 1660s she retired from her courtesan lifestyle and concentrated more on her literary friends – from 1667, she hosted her gatherings at l'hôtel Sagonne, which was considered "the" location of the salon of Ninon de l'Enclos despite other locales in the past. During this time she was a friend of Jean Racine, the great French playwright. Later she would become a close friend with the devout Françoise d'Aubigné, better known as Madame de Maintenon, the lady-in-waiting who would later become the second wife of Louis XIV. Saint-Simon wrote that "The lady did not like her to be mentioned in her presence, but dared not disown her, and wrote cordial letters to her from time to time, to the day of her death". Ninon eventually died at the age of 84, as a very wealthy woman. To the end, she "was convinced that she had no soul, and never abandoned that conviction, not even in advanced old age, not even at the hour of her death."

Legacy
Ninon de l'Enclos is a relatively obscure figure in the English-speaking world, but is much better known in France where her name is synonymous with wit and beauty. Saint-Simon noted "Ninon made friends among the great in every walk of life, had wit and intelligence enough to keep them, and, what is more, to keep them friendly with one another."

Edgar Allan Poe mentioned her in his short story "The spectacles," as did Rudyard Kipling the "Venus Annodomini". Edwin Arlington Robinson used Ninon as a symbol of aging beauty in his poem "Veteran Sirens." Dorothy Parker wrote the poem "Ninon De L'Enclos On Her Last Birthday" and also referred to Ninon in another of her poems, "Words Of Comfort To Be Scratched On A Mirror". L'Enclos is the eponymous heroine of Charles Lecocq's 1896 opéra comique, Ninette.

References

 The 1911 edition of Encyclopædia Britannica lists her date of birth being in November 1615.

Further reading
 Lucy Norton, Saint-Simon at Versailles, 1958 p. 100f.
 Michel Vergé-Franceschi, Ninon de Lenclos, Libertine du Grand Siècle, Paris, Payot, 2014, 432 pages

External links

 
 
 
 "Ninon de Lenclos". Internet Encyclopedia of Philosophy
 Ninon de l'Enclos at aelliott.com
 
 Ninon De Lenclos, On Her Last Birthday
Project Continua: Biography of Ninon de l'Enclos

1620 births
1705 deaths
Courtesans from Paris
French salon-holders
17th-century French women writers
17th-century French writers
17th-century letter writers
18th-century letter writers